Strangers From Within is the original (unpublished) title of William Golding's novel Lord of the Flies. The title was considered "too abstract and too explicit", so was eventually published as Lord of the Flies.

Strangers from Within or variations thereof may also refer to:

 The Stranger From Within, a track on the album Actual Fantasy
 Strangers Within, a British horror movie
 The Stranger Within, a US TV horror movie